Mark C. Hersam is a professor of Chemistry and Materials Science Engineering at Northwestern University (2000–present) who, according to the National Science Foundation, has made "major breakthrough[s]"  in the field of nanotechnology. He is a 2014 recipient of the MacArthur "Genius" Award and a 1996 Marshall Scholar. He is also an Associate Editor of ACS Nano. As of January 2022, he was cited over 54,500 times according to Google Scholar.

Education and early academic work

Education
Mark Hersam attended Downers Grove South High School in Downers Grove, IL where he was Valedictorian and an Eagle Scout. He then went on to receive his B.S. in Electrical Engineering at the University of Illinois at Urbana-Champaign in 1996. Upon winning the Marshall Scholarship, Hersam received a M.Phil. in Microelectronic Engineering and Semiconductor Physics from the University of Cambridge in 1997. His Ph.D was granted from the Electrical Engineering Department at the University of Illinois at Urbana-Champaign in 2000.

Early work
While at UIUC, Hersam did research under Professor David Ruzic in the Nuclear Engineering Department and Professor Joseph Lyding in the Electrical Engineering Department.

After graduating from UIUC, Hersam was an intern at the Argonne National Laboratory where he did research in the Energy Technology Division studying the energy-related applications of surface acoustic-wave-based sensing.

While at Cambridge University, Hersam was advised by Mark Welland and the two co-authored the paper "Potentiometry and repair of electrically stressed nanowires using atomic force microscopy" in the journal of Applied Physics Letters.

As a doctoral candidate, Hersam again worked with Professor Joseph Lyding at the Beckman Institute where they studied "atomic level manipulation and silicon-based molecular nanotechnology."

Research
As head of the Hersam Group at Northwestern University, Hersam has authored more than 137 peer-reviewed publications studying hybrid hard and soft nanoscale materials for applications in information technology, biotechnology, nanotechnology, and alternative energy.

Corporate connections and applications
Co-Founder of NanoIntegris
Intern at IBM Nanoscience

Honors and achievements

Honors
 Teacher of the Year in the Department of Materials Science and Engineering, Northwestern University 2003, 2007, 2009, 2010
 Materials Research Society Outstanding Young Investigator Award, 2010
 SES Research Young Investigator Award, Electrochemical Society, 2010
 Senior Member, Institute of Electrical and Electronics Engineers, 2009
 Young Alumni Achievement Award, ECE Department, UIUC, 2007
 AVS Peter Mark Memorial Award, 2006
 TMS Robert Lansing Hardy Award, 2006
 Presidential Early Career Award for Scientists and Engineers, 2005
 Office of Naval Research Young Investigator Award, 2005
 Army Research Office Young Investigator Award, 2005
 Alfred P. Sloan Research Fellowship, 2005
 Northwestern University Associated Student Government Faculty Honor Roll, 2004
 National Science Foundation CAREER Award, 2002
 Arnold and Mabel Beckman Foundation, Beckman Young Investigators Award, 2001
 Gregory Stillman Semiconductor Research Award, 2000
 American Vacuum Society Graduate Research Award, 1999

Scholarships
 Searle Center for Teaching Excellence Junior Fellow, 2001
 IBM Distinguished Fellowship, 1999
 Koehler Graduate Fellowship, 1998
 National Science Foundation Graduate Fellowship, 1997
 British Marshall Scholarship, 1996

Professional organizations and societies
 Co-Chair of the NSF International Study of Nanoscale Science and Engineering, 2009-
 AVS Nanometer-scale Science and Technology Division Executive Board Member, 2003-2005, 2007-2009
 Review of Scientific Instruments Editorial Board Member, 2001-2003
 Nanopatterning Synergistic Research Group Leader, Nanoscale Science and Engineering Center, 2001-
 Director of the Nanoscale Science and Engineering Center Research Experience for Undergraduates, 2001-
 National Science Foundation SBIR, IMR/MRI, MRSEC and NUE Panelist
 Member of IEEE, MRS, AVS, AIP, APS, ACS, TMS, ASEE, AAAS

In 2016, he was selected as a U.S. Science Envoy by the United States State Department.

Selected works 

 2006 -Sorting carbon nanotubes by electronic structure using density differentiation, MS Arnold, AA Green, JF Hulvat, SI Stupp, MC Hersam, Nature nanotechnology 1 (1), 60-65
 2014 - Emerging device applications for semiconducting two-dimensional transition metal dichalcogenides, D Jariwala, VK Sangwan, LJ Lauhon, TJ Marks, MC Hersam, ACS nano 8 (2), 1102-1120
 2015 - Synthesis of borophenes: Anisotropic, two-dimensional boron polymorphs, AJ Mannix, XF Zhou, B Kiraly, JD Wood, D Alducin, BD Myers, X Liu, Science 350 (6267), 1513-1516

Personal life
Hersam hosts Undergraduate Research Experience opportunity for students each summer.

See also

Notable Carbon Nanotube Scientists:

Richard Smalley
Sumio Iijima
Phaedon Avouris

Notable Northwestern University Professors:

Chad Mirkin
Tobin J. Marks

References

External links 
 Hersam Group at Northwestern University

1975 births
Living people
MacArthur Fellows
American nanotechnologists
People from Downers Grove, Illinois
Grainger College of Engineering alumni
Marshall Scholars
Alumni of the University of Cambridge
Northwestern University faculty